The 2012–13 Furman Paladins men's basketball team represented Furman University during the 2012–13 NCAA Division I men's basketball season. The Paladins, led by seventh-year head coach Jeff Jackson, played their home games at Timmons Arena and were members of the South Division of the Southern Conference ("SoCon"). They finished the season 7–24, 3–15 in SoCon play to finish in last place in the South Division. They lost in the quarterfinals of the SoCon tournament to Appalachian State.

Roster

Schedule

|-
!colspan=9| Exhibition

|-
!colspan=9| Regular season

|-
!colspan=9| 2013 Southern Conference men's basketball tournament

References

Furman Paladins men's basketball seasons
Furman
Furman Paladins men's b
Furman Paladins men's b